Monkey Melodies is a Silly Symphonies animated Disney short film. It was released in 1930 as the 13th film in the Silly Symphony Series.

Plot
All the animals in the jungle are singing and dancing, mostly monkeys and other primates with birds and crocodiles having their own dance numbers. The plot centers around two of the monkeys who are in love and express their romance in the form of dance and rhythm throughout the film.

Production 
The production of Monkey Melodies took place from July to August 1930. During production, the animators didn’t utilize model sheets to keep the characters designs consistent. Depending on the artist, the monkeys would be drawn using distinct styles.The film showcases a number of songs and tunes including, Down in Jungle Town (1908, Edward Madden & Theodore Morse), Aba Daba Honeymoon (1914, Arthur Fields & Walter Donovan), Narcissus (1899, Ethelbert Nevin), At a Georgia Camp Town Meeting (1897, Kerry Mills), and a brief use of the tune St. Louis Blues (W.C. Handy).

ReceptionVariety (October 15, 1930): "Just a wee bit better than the usual run of cartoon shorts. Given good musical synchronization, which draws a few laughs along with antics of the cartoon characters. Here it is two monks who are the sweethearts, with an alligator the villain. Usual stuff, cooked up in a different manner."Motion Picture News (October 18, 1930): "Foolishly Clever: Everything else, it seems, has had its cartoon day. Now it's the monkeys. Walt Disney has fairly outdone himself in the assortment of ridiculous postures and gyrations through which he puts his pen-and-ink characters. Cartoons are diverting when they get foolishly clever. Which is exactly what the producer has done with Monkey Melodies.The Film Daily (October 26, 1930): "A little love episode in the jungle, with two simians as the sweethearts and an alligator as the menacing villain, provides the framework for this cartoon comedy. Entirely well done both in action and in synchronized score."

Home media
The short was released on December 19, 2006, on Walt Disney Treasures: More Silly Symphonies, Volume Two.

 References 

 “Walt Disney's ‘Monkey Melodies (1930).” Walt Disney's "Monkey Melodies (1930),''http://cartoonresearch.com/index.php/walt-disneys-monkey-melodies-1930.

External links
 
http://cartoonresearch.com/index.php/walt-disneys-monkey-melodies-1930/ on Cartoonresearch
https://www.youtube.com/watch?v=mGQt3ofaYts on YouTube

American animated short films
1930 short films
1930s Disney animated short films
Silly Symphonies
1930 animated films
1930 films
Films directed by Burt Gillett
Films produced by Walt Disney
American black-and-white films
Columbia Pictures animated short films
Columbia Pictures short films
Animated films without speech
Films set in jungles
Animated films about monkeys
1930s American films